Dhuilya is a census town in Sankrail CD Block of Howrah Sadar subdivision in Howrah district in the Indian state of West Bengal. It is a part of Kolkata Urban Agglomeration.

Geography
It is adjacent to Mourigram and Andul.

Demographics
As per 2011 Census of India Dhuilya had a total population of 20,962 of which 10,569 (50%) were males and 10,393 (50%) were females. Population below 6 years was 1,681. The total number of literates in Dhuilya was 17,467 (90.59% of the population over 6 years).

Dhuliya was part of Kolkata Urban Agglomeration in 2011 census.

 India census, Dhuilya had a population of 18,399. Males constitute 52% of the population and females 48%. Dhuilya has an average literacy rate of 81%, higher than the national average of 59.5%: male literacy is 85% and female literacy is 77%. In Dhuilya, 8% of the population is under 6 years of age.

Transport
Andul Road (part of Grand Trunk Road/State Highway 6) is the artery of the town.

Bus

Private Bus
 61 Alampur - Howrah Station

Mini Bus
 13 Ranihati - Rajabazar
 13A Fatikgachi - Rajabazar
 20 Alampur - Ultadanga Station
 20A Mourigram - Salt Lake Tank no. 13

Bus Routes Without Numbers
 Mourigram railway station - Barrackpur Cantonment
 Andul railway station - New Town Ecospace

Train
Mourigram railway station and Andul railway station on Howrah-Kharagpur line serve the locality.

References

Cities and towns in Howrah district
Neighbourhoods in Kolkata
Kolkata Metropolitan Area